Afrixalus schneideri, also known as Schneider's banana frog, is a species of frog in the family Hyperoliidae.
It is endemic to a locality in Cameroon, but has not been found in the wild for many years. It is likely that it is not a valid species.

References

schneideri
Endemic fauna of Cameroon
Taxonomy articles created by Polbot
Amphibians described in 1899